Léa Fehner (born 15 October 1981) is a French film director and screenwriter.

Life and career
Born in Toulouse and raised in a travelling theatre family, Fehner attended classes in Nantes and at the INSAS school, before pursuing an education in screenwriting at La Fémis, from which she graduated in 2006. During her studies, she had internships at the film centre in Bamako and in Cambodia. Between 2000 and 2007, she wrote and directed several shorts, among which Sauf le Silence
was showcased at various film festivals including the Clermont-Ferrand International Short Film Festival and the Toronto Worldwide Short Film Festival. In 2009, she made her directorial feature film debut Silent Voice, starring Farida Rahouadj, Reda Kateb and Pauline Étienne. It won the Louis Delluc Prize for Best First Film in 2009 and was nominated for Best First Feature Film at the 35th César Awards.

Filmography

References

External links
 

1981 births
Living people
French film directors
French women film directors
French women screenwriters
French screenwriters
Mass media people from Toulouse